Joseph Bigot was a French architect. He was a local councillor of Quimper from 1870 till 1878. He built or renovated a number very important of monuments in Finistère, especially religious constructions.

Early life

Architectural work

See also
 
 Quimper Cathedral

References

Bibliography 

 
 
 

19th-century French architects
1807 births
1894 deaths
People from Quimper